The Communist Party of Galicia (PCG), is the affiliate of the Communist Party of Spain in Galicia.

History
It was founded by Santiago Álvarez Gómez (1913–2002). During the late years of Francoism and the Spanish democratic transition the party lost influence, with some sectors of its traditional social base joining the Spanish Socialist Workers' Party (PSOE) or the Galician People's Union (UPG).

In the local elections of 1979 the party gained 70 town councillors and 3 mayors (Cangas do Morrazo, O Grove and Mugardos). In the Galician elections of 1981 the PCG won a seat in the Parliament of Galicia for the Province of A Coruña. In 1985 the party lost its representation in parliament, not gaining any seat again until the Galician elections of 2012, when the coalition Galician Left Alternative won 9 deputies (5 - later 4 - of them were PCG members):

The current general secretary is Eva Solla, elected in 2014, being the first woman to lead the party

Election results

References

External links
PCG official page 
PCG Twitter

1968 establishments in Spain
Galicia
Political parties established in 1968
Socialist parties in Galicia (Spain)